Suzana Skoko (born 21 June 1971, in Zagreb) is a Croatian sport shooter. She competed for Croatia in the 1992 Summer Olympics in Barcelona and 1996 Summer Olympics in Atlanta. Her best Olympic result was 5th place in the 50 metre rifle three positions in 1992.

Achievements

External links
Suzana Skoko at Sports-Reference.com

1971 births
Living people
Sportspeople from Zagreb
Croatian female sport shooters
Olympic shooters of Croatia
Shooters at the 1992 Summer Olympics
Shooters at the 1996 Summer Olympics

Mediterranean Games gold medalists for Croatia
Competitors at the 1997 Mediterranean Games
Mediterranean Games medalists in shooting
20th-century Croatian women